Willamette Iron Works (also known as Willamette Iron and Steel Company or WISCO) was a general foundry and machine business established in 1865 in Portland, Oregon, originally specializing in the manufacture of steamboat boilers and engines.  In 1904, the company changed its name to Willamette Iron and Steel Works, under which name it operated continually until its close in 1990.

The works was very busy during the World War I shipbuilding boom, building boilers for Northwest Steel and Albina Engine & Machine Works in Portland, G. M. Standifer Construction in Vancouver, Union Iron Works, Schaw-Batcher and the Moore Dry Dock Company in San Francisco, Southwestern Shipbuilding and the Long Beach Shipbuilding Company in Los Angeles, Skinner & Eddy, J. F. Duthie and Ames in Seattle and Todd Construction in Tacoma, as well as completely fitting out ships launched by Northwest Steel.  During World War II, Willamette Iron & Steel was itself in the shipbuilding business: small naval auxiliaries, minesweepers, patrol craft, submarine chasers, and non-self-propelled lighters. These were built through WISCO's relationship with Henry Kaiser. The company built more than 70 ships during World War II, but they were smaller than those built by the three nearby Kaiser Shipyards. The ships were built on contract to the US and British governments. Willamette also built triple expansion main propulsion engines for Liberty ships.

Between the wars, the shipyard concentrated on building small commercial vessels. During the 1920s, the company manufactured a geared steam locomotive known as the "Willamette", a Shay-type locomotive for use in logging operations in Washington and Oregon.  Between 1901 and 1931 Willamette built over 2500 steam donkeys for use in the logging industry.

During World War II Willamette assembled over 800 Russian gauge Baldwin steam locomotives and shipped them to Vladivostok.  NW Front Ave. in Portland had a short distance of Russian gauge track for the engines to move from the engine house on the west side of Front to the loading dock on the east side of the street.  These were shipped across the Pacific on USSR flagged ships, since the USSR and the Empire of Japan were not at war.  A Porter 0-6-0 was bought from the US Government in Panama to switch the broad gauge track.

In the early 1970s, the company manufactured the first three turbine units for the third powerhouse to be built at the Grand Coulee Dam.

The company also made fire hydrants for the city of Portland in the late 19th century.

In 1945, after World War II ended, Willamette Iron and Steel continued as mostly a ship repair facility.  Over the years, business dropped as larger shipyards grew, and Willamette finally closed in 1990.

World War II Ships

 2 of 2 Catskill-class landing ships: , 
 ordered as cruiser minelayers on 8 January 1941
 23 of 123 s
  ... 
  ... 
 14 of 68 s
 PCE-891 ... PCE-904
 9 lighters: YFN-743 ... YFN-751
 6 barracks barges: APL-41 ... APL-46
 8 to 10 of 45 s (completion of Todd Tacoma hull)
  (disagrees:)
  (disagrees:)
  (AVG-22)
  (AVG-24)
 1 of 19 s (completion of Todd Tacoma hull)
 
 3 of 30 s (conversion of Moore Dry Dock Company hull)
 conversion of
 references:

Notes

References

Defunct companies based in Oregon
Companies established in 1865
Defunct shipbuilding companies of the United States
History of transportation in Oregon
Defunct locomotive manufacturers of the United States
Ironworks and steel mills in the United States
Manufacturing companies based in Portland, Oregon
Shipbuilding companies of Oregon
1865 establishments in Oregon
1990 disestablishments in Oregon
American companies established in 1865